Alexander "Sandy" Kennedy (born in Dalquhurn) was a Scottish footballer, who played for Eastern, Third Lanark and Scotland.

References

Sources

External links

London Hearts profile

Year of birth missing
Year of death missing
Scottish footballers
Scotland international footballers
Eastern F.C. players
Third Lanark A.C. players
Association football central defenders